Keenan Appiah-Forson (born 16 October 2001) is an English professional footballer who plays as a midfielder for West Ham United.

Career 
Forson joined West Ham United at the age of 14, following a successful trial with the club. On 9 December 2021, Forson made his senior debut for West Ham in a 1–0 loss against Dinamo Zagreb in the UEFA Europa League, coming on as an 87th minute substitute for Sonny Perkins. In February 2022 Appiah-Forson signed a new contract which would see him at the club until the summer of 2023. The deal included the option to extend his contract for a further year.

Personal life
Born in London, Forson is of Ghanaian descent.

Career statistics

References 

Living people
2001 births
Footballers from Greenwich
West Ham United F.C. players
English footballers
English people of Ghanaian descent
Black British sportspeople
Association football midfielders
English sportspeople of Ghanaian descent